Francis M. Nickell (1843–1913) was a contractor, a builder and a member of the Los Angeles City Council in the 1890s.

Biography

Nickell was born about June 1843 in Kentucky, then moved to Kansas and finally to Los Angeles in 1883. He lived in Santa Monica for three years but finally moved to 228 South Fremont Avenue in Los Angeles. The Los Angeles Times reported in his obituary that "he had a finger in the laying of the present metropolis and was engaged upon many of the notable structures" of the early city. He was in business at 725 West Third Street and was president of the Wilshire Boulevard Improvement Association and a member of Sampson Lodge, Knights of Pythias, and the East Gate Masonic Lodge.

He died on July 2, 1913, leaving a widow (Bettie C. Nickell) and five children—Mrs. J.K. Hutsell, Mrs. Philo Coonradt, Mrs. A.J. Renner, G. H. Nickell and H.B. Nickell.

City Council

Nickell was elected in the 1st Ward of the Los Angeles City Council for two two-year terms between 1890 and 1894 and again between 1896 and 1898. He was chairman of the committee that oversaw the construction of the Los Angeles outfall sewer into the Pacific Ocean and was also "instrumental in establishing Eastlake Park," the present Lincoln Park. Nickell was a Democrat.

Notes and references

1843 births
1913 deaths
Los Angeles City Council members
Businesspeople from Los Angeles
19th-century American politicians
19th-century American businesspeople